New Hampshire gained one seat after the 1810 Census. Its elections were held August 31, 1812.

See also 
 United States House of Representatives elections, 1812 and 1813
 List of United States representatives from New Hampshire

1812
New Hampshire
United States House of Representatives